Prince Aleksander Koniecpolski (1620–1659) was a Polish nobleman. He became the Grand Standard-Bearer of the Crown in 1641, the Palatine of Sandomierz Voivodeship in 1656, and the Starost of Perejasław, Korsun, Płoskirow and Dolina. He was the son of the famous hetman Stanisław Koniecpolski.

During the Chmielnicki Uprising, he was elected as one of the regimentarz of Pospolite ruszenie and took part in the losing battle of Pyliavtsi in 1648.

References

1620 births
1659 deaths
Aleksander 1620
Polish military personnel of the Khmelnytsky Uprising